Patel College of Science and Technology (formally known as PCST) is a leading engineering college in Bhopal, Madhya Pradesh. It is located at Ratibad in Bhopal.

History
PCST Bhopal was established in the year 2002 under the aegis of Vanshpati Smriti Shiksha Samiti, Bhopal. The institute is recognised by AICTE, New Delhi and affiliated to Rajiv Gandhi Proudyogiki Vishwavidyalaya, Bhopal.

Courses

Bachelor of Engineering
Computer Science Engineering
Mechanical Engineering
Electrical Electronics Engineering
Electronics and Communication Engineering
Civil Engineering
OTHER BRANCH

Master of Technology(M.TECH.)
Computer Science & Engineering	 	
Digital Communication	 	
Software Systems	 	
Thermal Engineering	 	
Information Technology
KSR

Master of Business Administration (MBA)

Master of Computer Application (MCA)

Polytechnic
Computer Science & Engineering	 	
Electronics & Communication	 	
Information Technology	 	
Mechanical Engineering
Electrical Engineering
Civil Engineering

See also
List of Engineering Colleges in Madhya Pradesh

References

External links

Engineering colleges in Madhya Pradesh
Bhopal district
Educational institutions established in 2002
2002 establishments in Madhya Pradesh